If We All Were Angels is a 1956 West German comedy film directed by Günther Lüders and starring Dieter Borsche, Marianne Koch and Hans Söhnker. It is a remake of the 1936 film If We All Were Angels.

Cast
 Dieter Borsche as Christian Kempenich
 Marianne Koch as Elisabeth Kempenich
 Hans Söhnker as Enrico Farlotti
 Carla Hagen as Marie
 Fita Benkhoff as Selma
 Gustav Knuth as Kommissar
 Erich Ponto as Amtsrichter
 Ingrid Pan as Fräulein Knüll
 Edith Hancke as Junge Animierdame
 Elisabeth Lennartz as Frau Schimmelpfennig
 Ellinor Lang
 Albert Florath as Justizrat Genius
 Joachim Teege as Amtsanwalt
 Rudolf Therkatz as Bürgermeister
 Walter Gross as Robert
 Willy Maertens as Jörges
 Adolf Dell as Bürgermeister

Bibliography 
 Williams, Alan. Film and Nationalism. Rutgers University Press, 2002.

External links 
 

1956 films
West German films
German comedy films
1956 comedy films
1950s German-language films
Films based on German novels
Films based on works by Heinrich Spoerl
Remakes of German films
Bavaria Film films
Films shot at Bavaria Studios
1950s German films